Soufiane Laghmouchi (born 10 August 1990) is a footballer who plays as a winger for VV Scherpenzeel in the Hoofdklasse. He formerly played for AGOVV Apeldoorn, FC Emmen and FC Volendam. Born in the Netherlands, he represented Morocco at under-23 international level.

Club career
Laghmouchi, who was born in Barneveld, Netherlands, started playing football in the youth department of Vitesse/AGOVV, a cooperation between the youth departments of Vitesse Arnhem and AGOVV. In 2010, he earned a professional contract.
On 13 August 2010, he made his debut in professional football as a part of the AGOVV squad against Fortuna Sittard. AGOVV won the match 3–1.
After the bankruptcy of AGOVV Apeldoorn, Laghmouchi signed with FC Volendam until the end of the season. In July 2014 he signed a 1-year contract with Dutch football club FC Emmen.

International career
Laghmouchi was called up for the Moroccan Olympic squad on September 28, 2010 by new coach Dutchman Pim Verbeek and he decided not to accept possible future call ups by the Netherlands football federation.

References

External links
 Voetbal International profile 
 

1990 births
Living people
Moroccan footballers
AGOVV Apeldoorn players
FC Volendam players
FC Emmen players
Eerste Divisie players
Tweede Divisie players
People from Barneveld
Dutch sportspeople of Moroccan descent
Association football wingers
AFC Eskilstuna players
Moroccan expatriate footballers
Moroccan expatriate sportspeople in Sweden
Expatriate footballers in Sweden
GVVV players
SV TEC players
Dutch expatriate sportspeople in Sweden
Dutch footballers
Dutch expatriate footballers
Footballers from Gelderland